Hamza Makhdoom, popularly known as Makhdoom Sahib (c. 1494 – c. 1576), was a Sufi mystic living in Kashmir. He is sometimes referred to as Mehboob-ul-Alam (literally, "beloved of the world") and Sultan-ul-Aarifeen (literally, "king among those who know God").

Early life
Hamza Makhdoom was born in the village of Tujjar near Sopore in Baramulla district. His father was called Baba Usman and came from a Chandravanshi Rajput family. According to tradition, teenage Hamza Makhdoom studied in the Shamsi Chak monastery for a year, and later studied jurisprudence, tradition, philosophy, logics, ethics and mysticism in a madrasa founded by Ismail Kubrawi.

Teachings
A prolific scholar and spiritual preacher, Hamza Makhdoom adhered to the tradition of Jalaluddin Bukhari. He directed his teachings specifically to the followers of Islam,  and under his influence a part of Kashmir's population trully followed the Hanafi jurisprudence . He was staunch follower of Shariah and Sunnah.

Death
He died at an age of 82 in year 1576 (984 AH) in Srinagar. 

Nearly fourteen years after his death, king Akbar built a shrine there which was reconstructed during the Afghan rule by Atta Mohammad Khan around 1821 AD. The shrine, located on the southern slope of Hari Parbat Hill and popularly called Makhdoom Sahib and Hazrat Sultan, is an important pilgrimage centre in Kashmir.

Atta Mohammad Khan Barakzai in his honour issued the coins bearing the names of Nur-ud-Din-Rishi and Hamza Makhdoom.

See also
Nund Rishi
Mir Sayyid Ali Hamadani

References

1494 births
1576 deaths
Sufism in Asia
Sufi mystics
Kashmiri people
Kashmir